Second Hand Love is a 1923 American film directed by William A. Wellman.

Cast
Buck Jones as Andy Hanks (*as Charles Jones)
Ruth Dwyer as Angela Trent
Charles Coleman as Dugg
Harvey Clark as Scratch, The Detective
Frank Weed as Deacon Seth Poggins
James Quinn as Dugg's Partner
Gus Leonard as The Constable

References

External links
 
 

Films directed by William A. Wellman
1923 films
1923 drama films
Silent American drama films
Fox Film films
American black-and-white films
American silent feature films
1920s English-language films
1920s American films